Camillo Gioja Barbera was a 19th-century Italian painter.
He painted aquarelles and oil paintings. Mostly he painted themes displaying rooms populated with aristocrats and clergy. He is recorded in the list of Comanducci. Interesting to know is that the Commanduci guide spelled his name in a faulty way, Cimillo Gioja Barbera signed his works with a double "l".

External links
A painting of Camillo Gioja Barbera
"Music in the Harem" Sotheby's
Camillo Gioja Barbera in the Commanduci list

19th-century Italian painters
Italian male painters
Year of death missing
Year of birth missing
19th-century Italian male artists